Global Special Effects, formally known as Snowmasters Inc., is a special effects company headquartered in Lexington, Alabama. The firm, founded in 1992 by former magician Francisco Guerra,  specializes in artificial snow, cryo, smoke, bubble and fog machines. The company's products have been used in music videos such as "Back to December" by Taylor Swift and "Mistletoe" by Justin Bieber, film productions such as Harry Potter and Lucky, television shows such as Fear Factor, and at Walt Disney Parks and Resorts.

History
The company was founded in 1992 after Francisco Guerra, a Cuban native who emigrated to the United States as a child, utilized a system for producing artificial snow to use in his magic shows. Guerra developed a 98% water and 2% surfactant solution which evaporates shortly after touching the ground, known as Evaporative Snow. as well as machines to distribute the substance in various forms.  Snowmasters has subsequently branched into other products, including fog, cryo, foam, smoke effects and bubble machines.

Products
Global Special Effects' main product offering is its proprietary artificial snow and range of snow machines, which sell for $1,500 to $5,000 each. Subsidiary companies of Snowmasters include Flogos, whose machines produce floating shapes constructed from helium-filled soap bubbles. Flogos has been contracted to produce Mickey Mouse shapes at Walt Disney World Resort in Florida. Another operating company, Foam Masters, manufactures foam machines for use at parties and auditoriums.

See also 
 Foam balloon

References

External links

Special effects companies
Companies based in Lexington, Kentucky